Doxa Proskinites Football Club is a Greek football club, based in Proskinites, Rhodope.

Honours

Domestic
 Thrace FCA Champions: 2
 2014-15, 2015–16
 Thrace FCA Cup Winners: 1
 2017-18

Football clubs in Eastern Macedonia and Thrace
Association football clubs established in 2005
2005 establishments in Greece
Gamma Ethniki clubs